Gaston Mesmaekers (16 October 1888 – 3 December 1982) was a Belgian equestrian. He competed at the 1924 Summer Olympics and the 1928 Summer Olympics.

References

External links
 

1888 births
1982 deaths
Belgian male equestrians
Olympic equestrians of Belgium
Equestrians at the 1924 Summer Olympics
Equestrians at the 1928 Summer Olympics
Sportspeople from Turnhout
20th-century Belgian people